Robert Allen Duffy is an American video game programmer who has been working for id Software since 1999. In 1999, Duffy created the map editor for Quake III Arena. Since 2013, Duffy has been serving as the Chief Technology Officer of id Software.

Credits
Robert Duffy's programming work consists mostly of id Software titles, ports of classics like Doom and Wolfenstein 3D are ported over to their respective platforms by other developers.

References

Living people
1963 births